is a Japanese retired breaststroke swimmer. He won gold medals at the men's 100 m and 200 m breaststroke events at the 2004 Summer Olympics, and the 2008 Summer Olympics – becoming the first and only swimmer to sweep the breaststroke events at consecutive Olympic games.

Major achievements
Kitajima, who was born in Tokyo, was the world record holder in the 100 m breaststroke that he set at the 2008 Beijing Olympics – this mark was broken by Brenton Rickard. He was also bronze medal winner in the same Olympics in the 4×100 m medley relay. He edged out his main rival Brendan Hansen who finished fourth while Kitajima won the gold medal and set the new world record.

He received four gold medals, one silver and two bronze medals in total at the 2004, 2008 and 2012 Olympics.

His most significant rival in the breaststroke was the American swimmer Brendan Hansen. They dueled at events such as the 2005 World Championships, 2004 Summer Olympics and 2003 World Championships. Kitajima set both world records for 100 m and 200 m breaststroke in the latter occasion. Later his best in 200 m was overcome by Dimitri Komornikov and then by Hansen, who also broke Kitajima's record in the 100 m.  Kitajima regained the world record (58.91) in the 100 m at the 2008 Summer Olympics. Kitajima regained the 200 m breaststroke world record in June 2008 at the Japan Open.  His time of 2:07.51 shaved nearly a second off the previous record of 2:08.50 set by Hansen in 2006.

During the 2004 Summer Olympics in Athens, Kitajima generated buzz for his primal screams of exuberance after edging out Hansen in the 100 m and 200 m breaststroke for the gold. At a pool side interview (3'24") following his victory in the 100 m, Kosuke Kitajima also popularised the phrase 'cho-kimochi-ii,' meaning "I feel really good." The word went on to win the 2004 U-Can Neologisms and Vogue Words contest.

During his gold medal winning 100 m breaststroke race at the 2004 Olympics, he used an illegal dolphin kick on a pull-out, although he was not disqualified, and the rules were changed less than one year later to allow a single dolphin kick after the start and after each turn.

Kitajima retired in April 2016 after missing qualification for the 2016 Summer Olympics in Rio de Janeiro. He was attempting to qualify for his fifth Olympics.

Personal bests
In long course swimming pools Kitajima's bests are:

  50 m breaststroke: 27.30 (13 April 2010)
 100 m breaststroke: 58.90 (3 April 2012)
 200 m breaststroke: 2:07.51 (8 June 2008)

See also
World record progression 100 metres breaststroke
World record progression 200 metres breaststroke
List of multiple Olympic gold medalists
List of multiple Olympic gold medalists at a single Games
List of multiple Olympic medalists

References

External links
 KITAJIMA, Kosuke International Who's Who. accessed September 4, 2006.
  
 Profile London 2012 Official Website
 

1982 births
Japanese male breaststroke swimmers
Olympic swimmers of Japan
Olympic gold medalists for Japan
Olympic silver medalists for Japan
Olympic bronze medalists for Japan
Swimmers at the 2000 Summer Olympics
Swimmers at the 2004 Summer Olympics
Swimmers at the 2008 Summer Olympics
Swimmers at the 2012 Summer Olympics
World record setters in swimming
Nippon Sport Science University alumni
Olympic bronze medalists in swimming
World Aquatics Championships medalists in swimming
Sportspeople from Tokyo
Medalists at the FINA World Swimming Championships (25 m)
Asian Games medalists in swimming
Swimmers at the 2002 Asian Games
Swimmers at the 2006 Asian Games
Swimmers at the 2010 Asian Games
Medalists at the 2012 Summer Olympics
Medalists at the 2008 Summer Olympics
Medalists at the 2004 Summer Olympics
Asian Games gold medalists for Japan
Asian Games silver medalists for Japan
Olympic gold medalists in swimming
Olympic silver medalists in swimming
Recipients of the Medal with Purple Ribbon
Medalists at the 2002 Asian Games
Medalists at the 2006 Asian Games
Medalists at the 2010 Asian Games
Living people
Goodwill Games medalists in swimming
Competitors at the 2001 Goodwill Games
20th-century Japanese people
21st-century Japanese people